The UK Singles Chart is one of many music charts compiled by the Official Charts Company that calculates the best-selling singles of the week in the United Kingdom. Before 2004, the chart was only based on the sales of physical singles. This list shows singles that peaked in the Top 10 of the UK Singles Chart during 1986, as well as singles which peaked in 1985 and 1987 but were in the top 10 in 1986. The entry date is when the single appeared in the top 10 for the first time (week ending, as published by the Official Charts Company, which is six days after the chart is announced).

One-hundred and forty-six singles were in the top ten in 1986. Ten singles from 1985 remained in the top 10 for several weeks at the beginning of the year, while "Cry Wolf" by A-ha and "Is This Love?" by Alison Moyet were both released in 1986 but did not reach their peak until 1987. "West End Girls by Pet Shop Boys was the only single from 1985 to reach its peak in 1986. Forty-three artists scored multiple entries in the top 10 in 1986. Bon Jovi, Chris de Burgh, Erasure, The Housemartins and Simply Red were among the many artists who achieved their first UK charting top 10 single in 1986.

The 1985 Christmas number-one, "Merry Christmas Everyone" by Shakin' Stevens, remained at number-one for the first week of 1986. The first new number-one single of the year was "West End Girls" by Pet Shop Boys. Overall, twenty different singles peaked at number-one in 1986, with George Michael (3, including two entries with Wham!) having the most singles hit that position.

Background

Multiple entries
One-hundred and forty-six singles charted in the top 10 in 1986, with one-hundred and thirty-five singles reaching their peak this year.

Forty-three artists scored multiple entries in the top 10 in 1986. Madonna secured the record for most top 10 hits in 1986 with six hit singles.

The Communards were one of a number of artists with two top-ten entries, including the number-one single "Don't Leave Me This Way". The Bangles, Falco, Janet Jackson, Pet Shop Boys and Status Quo were among the other artists who had multiple top 10 entries in 1986..

Chart debuts
Sixty-seven artists achieved their first top 10 single in 1986, either as a lead or featured artist. Of these, six went on to record another hit single that year: The Bangles, The Communards, Falco, The Housemartins, Robert Palmer and Samantha Fox. Five Star had three other entries in their breakthrough year.

The following table (collapsed on desktop site) does not include acts who had previously charted as part of a group and secured their first top 10 solo single.

Notes
Steve Harley was the frontman of Cockney Rebel, who reached number one in 1975 with "Make Me Smile (Come Up and See Me)" and had three other top 10 singles. His duet with Sarah Brightman was recorded under Harley's own name. Huey Lewis featured on the "We Are the World" charity single in 1985 as part of USA for Africa but his band scored a top 10 hit for the first time in 1986. Nigel Planer from The Young Ones (in character as Neil Pye) reached number two in 1984 with a cover "Hole in My Shoe" by Traffic.

Phil Fearon charted under his own name without his group Galaxy being credited for the first time on his number 8 entry "I Can Prove It". Peter Cetera was a member of Chicago from 1967 to 1985, reaching the top 10 with five singles including number-one "If You Leave Me Now". "Glory of Love" was his solo debut hit. Debbie Harry had her only chart entry independent of Blondie in 1986 – "French Kissin' in the USA" reached number 8 in the chart.

Songs from films
Original songs from various films entered the top 10 throughout the year. These included "Burning Heart" (from Rocky IV), "Absolute Beginners" (Absolute Beginners), "The Power of Love" (Back to the Future), "A Kind of Magic" (Highlander), "Live to Tell" (original instrumental version in Fire with Fire), "Glory of Love" (The Karate Kid Part II) and "Take My Breath Away" (Top Gun).

Charity singles
A number of songs recorded for charity reached the top 10 in the charts in 1986. The Comic Relief single was a new version of Cliff Richard's "Living Doll" featuring the cast of the television series The Young Ones, peaking at number one on 29 March 1986.

Tears for Fears re-recorded their 1985 single "Everybody Wants to Rule the World" for Sport Aid. It reached a high of number five on 7 June 1986, three places lower than the peak of the original single.

"Do They Know It's Christmas?" by Band Aid, which re-entered the top 10 at the end of 1985, was also in the chart for the first couple of weeks of 1986.

Best-selling singles
The Communards had the best-selling single of the year with "Don't Leave Me This Way". The single spent nine weeks in the top 10 (including four weeks at number one), sold over 755,000 copies and was certified gold by the BPI. "Every Loser Wins" by Nick Berry came in second place, selling more than 728,000 copies and losing out by around 27,000 sales. Boris Gardiner's "I Wanna Wake Up with You", "Living Doll" from Cliff Richard & The Young Ones and "Chain Reaction" by Diana Ross made up the top five. Singles by Chris De Burgh, Billy Ocean, Madonna, Berlin and Sinitta were also in the top ten best-selling singles of the year.

Top-ten singles
Key

Entries by artist

The following table shows artists who achieved two or more top 10 entries in 1986, including singles that reached their peak in 1985 or 1987. The figures include both main artists and featured artists, while appearances on ensemble charity records are also counted for each artist. The total number of weeks an artist spent in the top ten in 1986 is also shown.

Notes

 Released as a charity single by Band Aid in 1984 to aid famine relief in Ethiopia. It peaked at number-one for five weeks in 1984, later re-entering the top 10 in December 1985 for four weeks.
 "Last Christmas" peaked at number 2 on its initial release in 1984. It later re-entered the top 10 in December 1985 for four weeks.
 Released as the official single for Comic Relief.
 "Wonderful World" originally peaked at number 27 upon its initial release in 1960. It was re-issued in 1986 after being used in a television advertising campaign for Levi's jeans and entered the UK top 10 for the first time.
 "I Heard It Through the Grapevine" originally peaked at number-one upon its initial release in 1969. It was re-issued in 1986 after being used in a television advertising campaign for Levi's jeans.
 Re-released as a charity single for Sport Aid to support famine relief in Africa.
 "Reet Petite" reached number-one in 1986 after being reissued, 29 years after its initial release and two years after Jackie Wilson's death. It originally peaked at number 6 in 1957. This was the longest gap between a song's release and it rising to the top of the charts until Tony Christie's "Is This the Way to Amarillo?" in 2005.
 Figure includes single that peaked in 1985.
 Figure includes single that peaked in 1987.
 Figure includes an appearance on the "Do They Know It's Christmas?" charity single by Band Aid.
 Figure includes three top 10 hits with the group Wham!.
 Figure includes two top 10 hits with the group Status Quo.
 Figure includes a top 10 hit with the group Duran Duran.
 Figure includes a top 10 hit with the group Culture Club.
 Figure includes a top 10 hit with the group Big Country.
 Figure includes a top 10 hit with the group Spandau Ballet.
 Figure includes a top 10 hit with the group Frankie Goes to Hollywood.
 Figure includes a top 10 hit with the group Bananarama.
 Figure includes single that first charted in 1985 but peaked in 1986.

See also
1986 in British music
List of number-one singles from the 1980s (UK)

References
General

Specific

External links
1986 singles chart archive at the Official Charts Company (click on relevant week)
Official Top 40 best-selling songs of 1986 at the Official Charts Company

United Kingdom Singles top 10
Top 10 singles
1986